The Uniform Advantage/AACN Graduate Nursing Student Academy Scholarship is an award that acknowledges the important role nurses play in the health care system. It was developed based on a commitment to improving access to nursing students enrolled in master's and doctoral programs.

History 
In 2015, a company called Uniform Advantage, and the American Association of Colleges of Nursing (AACN), collaborated to form a new scholarship program for nurses enrolled in master's and doctoral programs. Uniform Advantage is a leading retailer of medical uniforms, nursing scrubs and medical supplies for health professionals. The AACN is an organization that, “serves the public interest by providing standards and resources, and by fostering innovation to advance professional nursing education, research, and practice." Since the collaboration between the AACN and Uniform Advantage, scholarships have been awarded to two deserving students each fall and spring semester.

Past recipients 
 Amanda Lee was a recipient of the Lydia's Uniforms/AACN Nursing Scholarship in fall 2006. Amanda applied for the scholarship while she was a student at South Dakota State University College of Nursing looking to specialize in Geriatric Nursing.
 Chimezie Iwwuanyanwu was a recipient of the Lydia's Uniforms/AACN Nursing Scholarship in fall 2006. Chimezie applied while attending Texas Women's University pursuing his goals of furthering his career in nursing as an educator and operating a health care service agency.
 Yonis Mudey was a recipient of the Lydia's Uniforms/AACN Nursing Scholarship in spring 2007. Yonis applied while attending San Francisco State University pursuing a BSN with a short-term goal of becoming an Advanced Practice Nurse and a long-term goal of becoming a researcher in adult pulmonary care.
 Nancy Carlin was a recipient of the Lydia's Uniforms/AACN Nursing Scholarship in spring 2007. Nancy applied while attending Duquesne University. Her main goal was to become a Nurse Practitioner with a Masters in Counseling.
 Meghan Campbell was a recipient of the Lydia's Uniforms/AACN Nursing Scholarship in fall 2007. She applied while attending University of Illinois Chicago, pursuing her goal to become a Nurse Anesthetist.
 Sadie Jones was a recipient of the Lydia's Uniforms/ AACN Nursing Scholarship in spring 2008. Sadie applied while attending Sinclair School of Nursing, University of Missouri, where she was pursuing a Master's degree in nursing.
 Monique Henry was a recipient of the Lydia's Uniforms/ AACN Nursing Scholarship in spring 2008. Already an LPN and RN, Monique applied for the scholarship while going to school at the University of North Florida where she was working toward her goal of becoming an Advanced Registered Nurse Practitioner.
 Gina Ryan was a recipient of the Lydia's Uniforms/ AACN Nursing Scholarship in fall 2008. Gina applied while attending the University of Oklahoma Health and Science Center. Gina's goals included becoming a Registered Nurse and working in Hospice and eventually owning her own hospice facility.
 Nicole Brainard was a recipient of the Lydia's Uniforms/ AACN Nursing Scholarship in fall 2008. Nicole was a student at Oregon Health and Science University while pursuing a Bachelor of Science degree. Her post graduation goals include working as a Registered Nurse and eventually working in the administration of her tribe's health clinic or hospital.

About the award 
The Uniform Advantage/AACN Excellence in Academics Nursing Scholarship is awarded to two recipients each fall and spring semester in the form of $2500 per winner. The deadline to apply for the scholarship is September 30 for fall and January 31, for spring. In order to qualify for entry the students must fill out the application form, have a minimum G.P.A. of 3.5 and write and submit a 250 word essay detailing their career goals and financial needs. Applications for the scholarship can be found at the Uniform Advantage' and AACN's websites.

Judging process 
Each semester, around 300 applications are received. The applications for the scholarship are carefully reviewed by the AACN and narrowed down to a group of finalists; the qualifications of the applicants are then checked. After deciding on a concrete group of finalists, the entries are sent on to Uniform Advantage where a panel of judges chooses a winner. Winners are chosen based on the information provided in their essay.

See also

 List of medicine awards

References 

Medicine awards
Nursing education
Scholarships in the United States
Nursing awards
Nursing in the United States